Megalopyge trossula is a moth of the family Megalopygidae. It was described by Paul Dognin in 1891. It is found in Costa Rica.

Adults have a yellow body and the wings are entirely denuded of scales, except for a few dark-grey ones at the base.

References

Moths described in 1891
Megalopygidae